The 2012 Racecar Euro Series was the 4th season of stock car racing in Europe, and the first under NASCAR sanction. The season began on April 8 at Circuit Paul Armagnac. Ander Vilariño was crowned Driver's Champion.

NASCAR's standard rules were adopted (beneficiary rule and green-white-checker finish).

Schedule

Results and standings

Races

Drivers
(key) Bold - Pole position awarded by time. Italics - Pole position set by final practice results or rainout. * – Most laps led.

See also
 2012 NASCAR Sprint Cup Series
 2012 NASCAR Nationwide Series
 2012 NASCAR Camping World Truck Series
 2012 NASCAR K&N Pro Series East
 2012 NASCAR Canadian Tire Series
 2012 NASCAR Toyota Series
 2012 NASCAR Stock V6 Series
 2012 ARCA Racing Series

External links
 

NASCAR Whelen Euro Series seasons
Racecar Euro Series